The North West Universities Association (NWUA) is a representative body in the North West of England, intended to advance the development of the thirteen higher education establishments.

Role
The primary aim of the NWUA is to act as an organisation through which the universities of the North West can identify common goals, and thus move forward together through collaborative action, thereby maximising their contribution to the social, economic and cultural life of the North West of England and managing to develop partnerships with business, industry and public bodies in this process.

A more general aim of the NWUA is to attempt to foster better overall relations between the institutions of the North West, and establish a lasting relationship.

NWUA also runs the Leonardo da Vinci programme, the European Commission's vocational training programme which aims to facilitate student and staff mobility throughout Europe. The programme provides funding for students to undertake a work placement related to their academic study in another European country and for staff to visit European institutions and companies to exchange knowledge and develop vocational training.

The NWUA is affiliated with the UK Government, the North West Regional Assembly, the North West Regional Development Agency, the Chamber of Commerce, CBI, the North West Science Council, and other organisations, who assist in promoting the collective ambitions of the establishments.

Member institutes
NWUA has thirteen members:

University of Bolton
University of Central Lancashire
University of Chester
University of Cumbria 
Edge Hill University
Lancaster University
University of Liverpool
Liverpool Hope University
Liverpool John Moores University
University of Manchester
Manchester Metropolitan University
Royal Northern College of Music
University of Salford

References

External links
Official Site

College and university associations and consortia in the United Kingdom
North West England